TWIB may refer to:

 This Week in Baseball, the weekly television program designed to show highlights of the previous week's Major League Baseball action.
 This Week In Blackness, the African-American culture blog and web series.
 The Woman in Black, a novel written by Susan Hill 
 The Women in Black, the 2012 film based on the novel